Presidential elections were held in the Comoros on 21 February 2016, with a second round to be held on 10 April 2016, alongside elections for the Governors of the three islands. A re-run of the second round was held in thirteen constituencies on Anjouan on 11 May. Azali Assoumani of the Convention for the Renewal of the Comoros was elected President with 41% of the vote.

Electoral system
The presidency of the Comoros rotates between the country's three main islands; Anjouan, Grande Comore and Mohéli. The 2006 elections were limited to candidates from Anjouan and the 2010 elections to Mohélian candidates. As a result, the 2016 elections will see presidential candidacy limited to Grande Comore residents.

A primary election took place on Grande Comore on 21 February, with the three top candidates progressing to the nationwide second round on 10 April, where a plurality determined the winner.

Campaign
On 30 October 2013 former President Ahmed Sambi launched the Juwa Party, announcing that he would run in the elections.

Results

Reactions

Domestic
 Mohamed Ali Soilihi, presidential candidate from the Union for the Development of the Comoros and former vice president of Comoros, rejected the results. Ali Soilihi alleged that the released results by the Independent National Electoral Commission is only partial and that the margin is too small for them to declare the results.

International
 African Union: The African Union observers headed by Moncef Marzouki declared the elections to be free and transparent and was conducted in a peaceful manner.
 : The Arab league declared the first round of elections free and fair.
 : Prior to the election the European Union help fund and train Independent National Electoral Commission to help them conduct free and fair elections. Though the EU did not send an observer mission to the isles, the International Francophonie Organization based in France sent an observer team. The organization commended both the people and the authorities that held the elections in a peaceful and orderly process. 
 : The UN Secretary general Ban Ki-moon commended the people for conducting the elections peacefully and requested that all members of the election resolve their issues in a peaceful and legal manner.

Aftermath 
After the provisional results were released, Mohamed Ali Soilihi refused to accept his defeat by Azali Assoumani and claimed that not all the results from Anjouan had been properly released and the margin was too narrow for CENI to declare a winner. The Constitutional Court ordered a partial re-run to be held in 13 constituencies by 15 May.

References

Comoros
Presidential elections in the Comoros
President